The 2021 lynchings in Punjab, India refers to the widely reported lynching incidents that occurred between December 18-19, 2021, at two Sikh temples in Punjab, India in which enraged mobs killed 2 men in response to alleged acts of sacrilege.

Lynching incidents

First Incident (18 December) 
The first incident took place on December 18, 2021 at the Amritsar Golden Temple, the holiest shrine for Sikhs, when a man allegedly barged into the inner sanctum, where Sikhism's holy book, the Guru Granth Sahib, is kept. The man grabbed a ceremonial sword placed next to the holy book; but was overpowered by Sikh guards and worshippers, and then beaten to death before the Police arrived at the scene.

Second Incident (19 December) 
The second murdered (not lynching) incident took place in the early hours of December 19, 2021, when mentally challenged man who was hungry stole a chapati from the gurudwara kitchen. Police found no evidence of sacrilege and also arrested people in murder charges. Punjab. The Kapurthala police claimed as per preliminary investigations, it seemed to be a case of theft and there was no evidence of sacrilege.

Response 
The Punjab Police reported that the victims remained unidentified as the Police did not find any Identity Card with them, but attempts were on to identify them by reviewing the security footage of the shrines.  
Meanwhile, the Akal Takht Jathedar Giani Harpreet Singh condemned the “sacrilege” attempt at the Golden Temple and sought a thorough investigation. 
Further, some intellectuals have noted that the silence of most political leaders on the lynching of the alleged culprits at the holy shrines of the Sikhs, was disturbing.

See also
2021 Singhu border lynching

References

2021 murders in India
Attacks in India in 2021
Lynching deaths in India
December 2021 events in India
December 2021 crimes in Asia
Sikhism-related controversies
Deaths by beating
Sikh terrorism in India
People murdered in Punjab, India
Amritsar